Carya texana, or black hickory, for its dark colored bark, is a North American tree in the walnut family, Juglandaceae. It is endemic to the United States, found primarily in the southern Great Plains and the Lower Mississippi Valley. It is an endangered species in Indiana, where it occurs in the southwest corner of the state.

Description
It has dark gray to black bark with a tight "diamond" patterning. The leaves usually have a dense coating of scales, imparting a rusty brown color. They are pinnately compound usually with seven leaflets, but sometimes five or nine. The fruits (nuts) are bronze to reddish brown and the seeds can be sweet and edible, but are sometimes bitter.

Genetics
Black hickory is a 64-chromosome species that readily hybridizes with tetraploid C. tomentosa. Hybrids with 32 chromosomes may also occur.

References

texana
Edible nuts and seeds
Endemic flora of the United States
Plants described in 1861
Trees of the United States
Endangered flora of the United States
Flora without expected TNC conservation status